The year 1991 in architecture involved some significant architectural events and new buildings.

Buildings and structures

Buildings

 One Canada Square at Canary Wharf in London, designed by César Pelli & Associates, becomes the tallest building in the United Kingdom.
 Stansted Airport terminal building in Essex, England, designed by Norman Foster.
 Rebuilt Liverpool Street station in London, designed by Nick Derbyshire, is opened.
 The Tianjin Radio and Television Tower in Tianjin, China is completed.
 The Sainsbury Wing of the National Gallery in London, designed by Robert Venturi and Denise Scott Brown, is opened.
 Norwegian Glacier Museum in Fjærland, designed by Sverre Fehn, is built.
 Extended Brentwood Cathedral in England, designed by Quinlan Terry, is dedicated.
 University of Vaasa Palosaari stage 1 buildings, Finland, designed by Käpy and Simo Paavilainen.
 Key Tower in Cleveland, Ohio, United States is completed.
 The Messeturm in Frankfurt am Main, Germany is completed.
 TD Canada Trust Tower, Calgary in Calgary, Alberta
 Carnegie Hall Tower in Manhattan, New York, United States is completed.
 Bell Atlantic Tower in Philadelphia, Pennsylvania, United States is completed.
 Bourke Place in Melbourne, Australia is completed.
 Melbourne Central Shopping Centre in Melbourne, Australia is completed.
 The Friedrich Clemens Gerke Tower in Cuxhaven, Lower Saxony, Germany is completed.
 The Guangzhou TV Tower in Guangzhou, China is completed.
 The West Tower of the Stardust Resort & Casino in Las Vegas, Nevada, United States is completed.
 101 Collins Street designed by architects Denton Corker Marshall is completed in Melbourne.
 "The Corns" residential towers, "1000 Years" housing estate, Katowice, Poland, designed by Henryk Buszko and Aleksander Franta, is completed.

Awards
AIA Gold Medal – Benjamin C. Thompson.
Architecture Firm Award – Zimmer Gunsul Frasca Architects.
Grand Prix de l'urbanisme – Jean Dellus.
Grand prix national de l'architecture – Christian Hauvette.
Praemium Imperiale Architecture Laureate – Gae Aulenti.
Pritzker Prize – Robert Venturi.
Prix de l'Académie d'Architecture de France – Norman Foster.
RAIA Gold Medal – Donald Bailey.
RIBA Royal Gold Medal – Colin Stansfield Smith.
Twenty-five Year Award – Sea Ranch Condominium One

Births

Deaths
 August 19 – Hans van der Laan, Dutch monk and architect (born 1904)

 
20th-century architecture